Alexander W. Arbuckle I House, also known as the Michael Baker House, is a historic home located near Lewisburg, Greenbrier County, West Virginia. It was built in 1822, and is a two-story, brick "T"-shaped residence with Greek Revival style influences.  It features a two-story portico with four plastered round columns and Chinese Chippendale style railings.

It was designed and built by contractor and architect John W. Dunn and associates David Spott and Andrew White.  The house is a farmhouse.  It is regarded as the "'architectural gem' of the region".

It was listed on the National Register of Historic Places in 1976.

References

Houses on the National Register of Historic Places in West Virginia
Greek Revival houses in West Virginia
Houses completed in 1822
Houses in Greenbrier County, West Virginia
National Register of Historic Places in Greenbrier County, West Virginia
John W. Dunn buildings
1822 establishments in Virginia